Matthew Alexander Hunter Correa (born February 20, 1998), better known as Matt Hunter, is an American singer, songwriter and voice actor of Colombian-Italian descent.

Early life and education
Hunter was born in New York City, and raised in Paramus, New Jersey. His mother is Colombian, and his father is Italian.

Career

Music
Hunter worked in voice acting from ages 9 to 12, at which point he began posting YouTube videos of himself playing the guitar and singing various covers, occasionally in Spanish. His videos went viral and he traveled around Latin America building his fan base in a grass roots fashion. Around this time, he was dubbed the "Latino Justin Bieber". Marc Anthony later called Hunter "the future" of music.

At 13, Hunter released his first single, "Mi Amor". He released follow-up singles in English and Spanish, "Right Here, Right Now" and "Mi Senorita", in 2012, and then his EP Right Here, Right Now. For the 2014 FIFA World Cup, he released the songs "Minha Mina Ta Loca" and "Mi Chica Esta Loca" with Pitbull, in both Portuguese and Spanish versions. By 2016 he had amassed 200,000 subscribers on his YouTube channel and over 500,000 Twitter followers.
  
Hunter splits his time between New York, Los Angeles, Miami, and Latin America.

Television
As a voice actor, Hunter played the singing role of Diego Márquez in the final two seasons of The Nickelodeon animated television series Go, Diego, Go! and played the same character in Dora the Explorer. He auditioned for the role when he was 10, recording the voice of Diego until he was 12. He also released his weekly comedy webisode series Fuego Fridays.

Performances
Hunter has performed live in the United States, Puerto Rico, Mexico, Spain, Chile, Brazil, Dominican Republic, Colombia, Argentina, Costa Rica and Ecuador. In May 2013, he headlined and sold out Chile's 12,000 seat Movistar Arena.

Awards and nominations
Hunter was nominated for Favorite Pop Artist at the 2013 Premios Juventud, presented by Univision (which did actually carry Spanish dubs of both Dora the Explorer and Go, Diego, Go! as part of its Planeta U block from 2008 to 2014).

Filmography

Discography 
EPs

Singles 
"Home for the Holidays" (2011)
"Mi Señorita" (2012)
"Mi Amor" (2012)
"Right Here, Right Now" (2013)
"Te Vi" (2014)
"Mi Chica Está Loca" (2014)
"Mi Chica Está Loca" (alternative version feat. Pitbull) (2014)
"Mas Que Tu Amigo" (2015)
"Te Necesito" (feat. Augusto Schuster) (2016)
"Amor Real" (2017)
"Dicen" (duet with Lele Pons) (2018)
"Lista De Espera" (feat. Isabela Moner) (2018)
"Una Vez Más" (feat. Tommy Boysen) (2019)
"Cazador" (feat. Lenny Tavarez) (2019)
"Problemas" (feat. GASHI, Big Soto) (2019)
"Entera" (with Carla Fernandes) (2020)
"Suave" (with Corona Smith) (2020)
"Error" (with Lalo Ebratt) (2020)

Covers
"All of Me" (from John Legend) (2014)
"Todo Cambiara" (Spanish version of Justin Timberlake's "Not a Bad Thing") (2015)

Featured in
"Fiesta" (StereO 4 feat. Matt Hunter) (2014)

References

External links 

1998 births
American child singers
American male singer-songwriters
American male television actors
Child pop musicians
Living people
American people of Colombian descent
American people of Italian descent
American male voice actors
People from Paramus, New Jersey
21st-century American singers
21st-century American male singers
Universal Music Latin Entertainment artists
Singer-songwriters from New Jersey